3 A.M. or 3AM may refer to:

 a time in the 12-hour clock
 one definition of the Witching hour

Film and television
3 A.M. (2001 film), an American crime film
3 A.M. (2012 film), a Thai horror 3D film
3 A.M. (2014 film), a Hindi musical horror film
3AM (TV series), a 2015 American reality documentary series

Music
3 A.M, the 2012 debut album by Cali y El Dandee
"3AM" (Matchbox Twenty song), 1997
"3AM" (Kleerup song), 2008
"3 a.m." (Eminem song), 2009
"Thunderbirds / 3AM", a 2004 single by Busted
"3 A.M.", a song by Young Jeezy from the 2006 album The Inspiration
"3 A.M.", a song by Jesse & Joy from the 2015 album Un Besito Más
"3AM", a song by Kate Nash from the 2013 album Girl Talk
"3am", a song by Meghan Trainor from the 2015 album Title
"3 A.M.", a song by NF from the 2017 album Perception
"3AM", a song by Halsey from the 2020 album Manic
"3AM (Pull Up)", a 2017 song by Charli XCX

Other uses
3:AM Magazine, a Paris-based magazine

See also
The 3AM Girls, gossip columnists for The Daily Mirror
"3 a.m. Eternal", song by the KLF

Date and time disambiguation pages